Zamzam is a given name of African origin.

List of people with the given name 

 Zamzam Abdi Adan, Somali politician
 Zamzam Ibrahim, British-Somali student politician
 Zamzam Mohamed, Kenyan politician
 Zamzam Mohamed Farah (born 1991), Somali female athlete

See also 
 Zamzam (disambiguation)
 Zamzama

Feminine given names
African feminine given names